Premiership of William Pitt may refer to:
 Premiership of William Pitt, 1st Earl of Chatham, as prime minister of Great Britain, 1766–1768
 First premiership of William Pitt the Younger, as prime minister of Great Britain and the United Kingdom, 1783–1801
 Second premiership of William Pitt the Younger, as prime minister of the United Kingdom, 1804–1806

See also
 Great Britain in the Seven Years' War
 Pitt ministry (disambiguation)
 United Kingdom in the Napoleonic Wars
 William Pitt (disambiguation)